The 2001 Calgary Stampeders season was the 44th season for the team in the Canadian Football League and their 63rd overall. The Stampeders finished in 2nd place in the West Division with an 8–10 record and qualified for the playoffs for the 13th consecutive season, establishing a franchise record. After defeating the BC Lions and Edmonton Eskimos in the West Division playoffs, the team advanced to the 89th Grey Cup. The Stampeders defeated the heavily favoured Winnipeg Blue Bombers  to win their fifth Grey Cup championship.

Offseason

CFL Draft

Preseason

Regular season

Season standings

Season schedule

Playoffs

Grey Cup

Awards and records

2001 CFL All-Stars
RB – Kelvin Anderson
WR – Travis Moore
OG – Jay McNeil
DT – Joe Fleming

References

Calgary Stampeders seasons
N. J. Taylor Trophy championship seasons
Grey Cup championship seasons
CalgCalgary Stampeders Season, 2001
2001 in Alberta